Averis is a surname.

List of people with the surname 

 James Averis (born 1974), English cricketer
 John Averis, a British firefighter who died in 2007 fighting the 2007 Warwickshire warehouse fire

See also 

 Avarice (disambiguation)

Surnames of British Isles origin